Taylor Chorney (born April 27, 1987) is a Canadian-born American former ice hockey defenceman. He played parts of eight seasons in the National Hockey League (NHL) for the Edmonton Oilers, St. Louis Blues, Pittsburgh Penguins, Washington Capitals, and Columbus Blue Jackets.

Playing career

Prior to being drafted by the Edmonton Oilers with the 36th overall pick in the 2005 NHL Entry Draft, Chorney previously played at the University of North Dakota. He also was on Team USA at the 2006 World Junior Championships. Chorney represented the USA again in the 2007 World Juniors, where he was team captain.

Chorney made his NHL debut on April 10, 2009 against the Calgary Flames. He recorded his first NHL point in his first game of the 2009–10 season, by assisting one of Zack Stortini's two goals on October 12, 2009 on the road against the Nashville Predators. Taylor Chorney scored his first NHL goal against the Dallas Stars on February 15, 2011 at Rexall Place.

On October 10, 2011, Chorney was placed on waivers with the purpose of being assigned with the Oklahoma City Barons. On October 11, 2011, Chorney was claimed off of waivers by the St. Louis Blues. After only two games with the Blues on November 10, 2011, he was again waived and was re-claimed by the Edmonton Oilers.

On July 1, 2012, Chorney signed a one-year, two-way deal as a free agent to return to the St. Louis Blues.

On July 1, 2014, Chorney joined his third NHL club, in signing a one-year two way contract with the Pittsburgh Penguins. Chorney spent the majority of the 2014–15 season with AHL affiliate, the Wilkes-Barre/Scranton Penguins, however appeared in 7 games with Pittsburgh on recall.

On the first day of free agency, Chorney was signed to a one-year contract with the Washington Capitals on July 1, 2015. After appearing in 24 games during the 2017–18 season Chorney was placed on waivers by the Capitals on February 20, 2018, and was claimed by the Columbus Blue Jackets the following day. Chorney remained on the Blue Jackets roster, however frequented as a healthy scratch. He appeared in just 1 game with the Blue Jackets to end the season.

As a free agent, Chorney left the NHL after 8 seasons in agreeing to an optional two-year contract with the Swiss HC Lugano of the NL, on July 7, 2018. On April 8, 2019, Lugano activated Chorney's option for a second season with the team. For 2020–21, Chorney signed with EC Red Bull Salzburg of the IceHL. 

Chorney retired from professional hockey after the conclusion of the 2020–21 IceHL season.

Personal life
Chorney was born in Thunder Bay, Ontario, but grew up in Hastings, Minnesota, and has dual citizenship to Canada and the United States, as he was born to a Canadian father and an American mother. 

His father, Marc, played 210 games in the NHL for the Pittsburgh Penguins and Los Angeles Kings. He has a younger brother, Marcus Chorney, who previously played hockey at Shattuck St. Mary's prep school located in Fairbult, Minnesota. He currently plays for Quinipiac University.

Career statistics

Regular season and playoffs

International

Awards and honors

References

External links
 
Bio at undsports.com

1987 births
Living people
American men's ice hockey defensemen
Canadian ice hockey defencemen
Chicago Wolves players
Columbus Blue Jackets players
EC Red Bull Salzburg players
Edmonton Oilers draft picks
Edmonton Oilers players
Ice hockey players from Minnesota
Ice hockey people from Ontario
HC Lugano players
North Dakota Fighting Hawks men's ice hockey players
Oklahoma City Barons players
People from Hastings, Minnesota
Peoria Rivermen (AHL) players
Pittsburgh Penguins players
St. Louis Blues players
Sportspeople from Thunder Bay
Springfield Falcons players
Washington Capitals players
Wilkes-Barre/Scranton Penguins players
AHCA Division I men's ice hockey All-Americans